Cyril Suk III (born 29 January 1967) is a former professional tennis player. A doubles specialist, Suk won five Grand Slam titles, one men's doubles and four Grand Slam mixed doubles titles and 32 ATP Tour doubles titles during his career.

Early life
Suk was born in Prague, Czechoslovakia, a member of a prominent Czech tennis family. His mother, Věra Suková, was a women's singles finalist at Wimbledon in 1962. His father, Cyril Suk II, was President of the Czechoslovak Tennis Federation. His sister, Helena Suková, was an even more successful professional player on the women's tour who teamed-up with Suk to win three Grand Slam mixed doubles titles in the 1990s.

Juniors
In 1985, Suk partnered fellow-Czech Petr Korda to win the boys' doubles title at the French Open. Suk and Korda were ranked the joint-World No. 1 junior doubles players that year.

Career
Suk claimed his first Grand Slam mixed doubles title in 1991 at the French Open, partnering sister Helena. In 1992, he teamed up with Larisa Neiland to win the Wimbledon mixed doubles title. He went on to win the Wimbledon mixed doubles crown on two further occasions partnering Helena – in 1996 and 1997. In 1998, Suk teamed up with Sandon Stolle to win the US Open men's doubles title.

Suk's career-high doubles ranking was World No. 7 in 1994. (In singles, his career-high ranking was World No. 180 in 1988. He has largely focused on doubles play during his career.)

Suk was selected as captain of the Czech Republic's Davis Cup team for the 2003 season.

Suk married his wife Lenka in 1991. They have a son, Cyril IV (born 1992), who is a PGA Tour professional and a daughter, Natalie Mia (born 1996), who is also playing tennis, mostly on ITF Tour.

Career finals

Doubles (32 titles – 27 runners-up)

Doubles performance timeline

References

External links
 
 
 

1967 births
Living people
Czech male tennis players
Czechoslovak male tennis players
French Open champions
French Open junior champions
Olympic tennis players of the Czech Republic
Tennis players from Prague
Tennis players at the 2004 Summer Olympics
US Open (tennis) champions
Wimbledon champions
Grand Slam (tennis) champions in mixed doubles
Grand Slam (tennis) champions in men's doubles
Sportspeople from Bradenton, Florida
Grand Slam (tennis) champions in boys' doubles